Ove Bech Nielsen (3 August 1932 – 24 February 2016) was a Danish footballer. Between 1951 and 1958 he played for Akademisk Boldklub. He played in eight matches for the Denmark national football team from 1954 to 1958. He was also named in Denmark's squad for the qualification tournament for the 1958 FIFA World Cup.

References

External links
 

1932 births
2016 deaths
Danish men's footballers
Denmark international footballers
Akademisk Boldklub players
Association footballers not categorized by position